Beer in Belgium includes pale ales, lambics, Flemish red ales, sour brown ales, strong ales and stouts. In 2018, there were 304 active breweries in Belgium, including international companies, such as AB InBev, and traditional breweries including Trappist monasteries. On average, Belgians drink 68 liters of beer each year, down from around 200 each year in 1900. Most beers are bought or served in bottles, rather than cans, and almost every beer has its own branded, sometimes uniquely shaped, glass. In 2016, UNESCO inscribed Belgian beer culture on their list of the intangible cultural heritage of humanity.

History
In Belgium, beer was already produced in the Roman era, as evidenced by the excavation of a brewery and malthouse from the 3rd and 4th centuries AD at Ronchinne. During the Early and High Middle Ages, beer was produced with gruit, a mix of herbs and spices that was first mentioned in 974 when the bishop of Liège was granted the right to sell it at Fosses-la-Ville. From the 14th century onwards, gruit was replaced by hops, after the example of imported beers from northern Germany and Holland. After that, several Belgian towns developed their own types of beer for export to other regions, most notably the white beer of Leuven and Hoegaarden, the caves of Lier and the uitzet of Ghent.

Monasteries played only a small role in beer production and mostly brewed for their own consumption and that of their guests. Monastic brewing would only receive some renown from the late 19th century onwards, when the trappists of Chimay produced a brown beer that was commercially available.

In 1885, a change in legislation made brewing of German-style bottom-fermenting beers viable in Belgium, and it was only from then that large industrial-scale brewing in Belgium took off. During the 20th century the number of breweries in Belgium declined from 3223 breweries in 1900 to only 106 breweries in 1993. Yet, a number of traditional beer styles, such as white beer, lambic and Flemish old brown were preserved, while new local, top-fermented styles developed, such as spéciale belge, abbey beer and Belgian strong ale. In 1988, the country's two biggest breweries, Artois and Piedboeuf, formally merged to become Interbrew, then the world's 18th biggest brewer, which was to merge with AmBev in 2004 to become today's AB InBev, the biggest beer producing company in the world.

Methods

In Belgium, four types of fermentation methods are used for the brewing of beer, which is unique in the world. However, for good understanding of labels of Belgian beer and reference works about Belgian beer often use different terms for the fermentation methods based on archaic or traditional jargon: 
 Spontaneous fermentation with beers that are unique in Europe: "lambic" and the derived faro, gueuze and kriek beers
Warm fermentation is referred to as top or high fermentation for Trappist beers, white beers, ale, most other special beers
Mixed fermentation for "old-brown" type beers
Cool fermentation is referred to as low fermentation for lager or pilsner, or bottom fermentation

Belgian beer types 
Belgian beers have a range of colours, brewing methods, and alcohol levels.

Trappist beers

Beers brewed in Trappist monasteries are termed Trappist beers. For a beer to qualify for Trappist certification, the brewery must be in a monastery, the monks must play a role in its production and the policies and the profits from the sale must be used to support the monastery or social programs outside. Only twelve monasteries currently meet these qualifications, six of which are in Belgium, two in the Netherlands, one in Austria, one in the United States, one in Italy and one in England. Trappist beer is a controlled term of origin: it tells where the beers come from, it is not the name of a beer style. Beyond their being mostly warm fermented, Trappist beers have very little in common stylistically.

The current Belgian Trappist producers are:
 Chimay sells Red Label (dark, 7% ABV dubbel), White Label (Blonde, ABV 8%, tripel) and Blue Label (dark, 9% ABV, Christmas), Chimay dorée Gold cap (blonde, 4.8% ABV, enkel).
 Orval sells a "unique" dry-hopped 6.2% amber beer.
 Rochefort sells three dark beers, "6" (7.5% ABV). "8" (9.2% ABV) and "10" (11.3% ABV) and one blonde beer "Triple Extra" (8.1% ABV)
 Westmalle sells Dubbel (7% ABV) and Tripel (9.5% ABV),
 Westvleteren sells Green Cap or "Blonde", (5.8% ABV), Blue Cap (dark, 8% ABV) or "8", and Yellow Cap (dark, 10.2% ABV) or "12".

In addition to the above, a lower-strength beer is sometimes brewed for consumption by the brothers (patersbier) or sold on site.

Abbey beers

The designation "abbey beers" (Bières d'Abbaye or Abdijbier) originally applied to any monastic or monastic-style beer. After introduction of an official Trappist beer designation by the International Trappist Association in 1997, it came to mean products similar in style or presentation to monastic beers.
In other words, an Abbey beer may be:
 produced by a non-Trappist monastery—e.g. Benedictine; or
 produced by a commercial brewery under commercial arrangement with an extant monastery; or
 branded with the name of a defunct abbey by a commercial brewer;

In 1999, the Union of Belgian Brewers introduced a "" logo
to indicate beers brewed under license to an existing or abandoned abbey,
as opposed to other abbey-branded beers which the trade markets using other implied religious connections, such as a local saint. The requirements for registration under the logo include the monastery having control over certain aspects of the commercial operation, and a proportion of profits going to the abbey or to its designated charities. Monastic orders other than the Trappists can be and are included in this arrangement.
The "Abbey beer" logo and quality label is no longer used for beers given the name of a fictitious abbey, a vaguely monastic branding or a saint name without mentioning a specific monastery. Some brewers may produce abbey-style beers such as dubbel or tripel, using such names but will refrain from using the term Abbey beer in their branding.

What connoisseurs now recognize as Trappist breweries began operations in 1838. Several monasteries, however, maintained "working" breweries for 500+ years before the French regime disrupted religious life (1795–1799). Even then, some Abbey beers such as Affligem Abbey, whose name now appears on beers made by the Heineken-owned Affligem Brewery, resumed brewing from "working" monasteries until the occupation of most of Belgium in World War I. Commercial Abbey beers first appeared during Belgium's World War I recovery.

Although Abbey beers do not conform to rigid brewing styles, most tend to include the most recognizable and distinctive Trappist styles of brune (Belgian brown ale, aka dubbel), strong pale ale or tripel, and blonde ale or blond. Modern abbey breweries range from microbreweries to international giants, but at least one beer writer warns against assuming that closeness of connection with a real monastery confirms a product's quality.

, 18 certified Abbey beers existed:
 Achel sells Achel 5 Blonde (5% ABV, draught only), Achel 5 Brune (5% ABV, draught only), Achel 8 Blonde (8% ABV, tripel), Achel 8 Brune (8% ABV, dubbel), Extra Blonde (9.5% ABV.tripel), Extra Brune (9.5% ABV, dubbel).
 Abbaye de Cambron, brewed in Silly by Brasserie de Silly.
 Abbaye de Bonne Espérance, previously brewed by Lefebvre Brewery, since 2015 more locally by La Binchoise.
 Abdij Dendermonde, brewed in Merchtem by 
 Abbaye de Saint-Martin, historically referenced to 1096, is brewed near Tournai by Brasserie Brunehaut.
 Affligem, produced for Affligem Abbey by a Heineken-owned brewery.
  is located on the grounds of a former abbey.
 Bornem is brewed in Oost-Vlaanderen by Brouwerij Van Steenberge
 Floreffe is brewed to fund a school housed in a former monastery.
 Grimbergen, made by the large Alken Maes brewery for an extant Norbertine abbey.
 Keizersberg is brewed in Oost-Vlaanderen by Brouwerij Van Steenberge.
 Leffe, the Abbey brand of Stella Artois, itself part of the multinational Inbev corporation, is brewed under licence from an extant brewery. It is thought to be the first such arrangement. Leffe has global distribution.
 Maredsous, the Abbey brand of Duvel Moortgat, Belgium's second largest brewer, licensed from Maredsous Abbey.
 Ramée is brewed in Purnode by Brasserie du Bocq.
 St. Feuillien is a small independent brewery.

Other non-certified Abbey beers include:-
 Abbaye des Rocs, made by a farmers' co-operative and named after a local ruined abbey.
 Corsendonk, abbey beer brewed by a brewery in the name of the Corsendonk priory (monastery) in Oud-Turnhout
 Kasteelbier, monastic style beers brewed in a castle.
 St. Bernardus brewery, based on Watou originally brewed under contract for the abbey of St Sixtus at Westvleteren, but continues on an independent basis, in parallel with production at the monastery itself. Their range is considered a close match in recipe and style to the St Sixtus beers, which can be hard to obtain outside the area.
 Tripel Karmeliet, with a three-grain recipe, is produced by Bosteels Brewery, who also make Pauwel Kwak. Bosteels, and Tripel Karmeliet, are now part of AB InBev after a not-so-popular take-over in 2016.
 Averbode.
 Braxatorium Parcensis.
 Abdij van 't Park, an Aldi house brand abbey beer, made by Brouwerij Haacht Brasserie.  Named after the abbey in Heverlee, Leuven. 
 Florival, a Delheize house brand abbey beer, made by Brouwerij Affligem. Named after the abandoned abbey of Florival, in the rural municipal of Grez-Doiceau.

Pils or pale lager 

This style makes up the bulk of beer production and consumption in Belgium. Belgian
Pilsners are not particularly distinctive or renowned by connoisseurs. The top brands include Jupiler (within Belgium) and Stella Artois (both brewed by Inbev), Maes pils and Cristal (both brewed by the Alken Maes branch of Heineken). Stella Artois, originating in Belgium, is distributed globally.

The Pilsnerbeer is which is popularly called "pintje" (in Flemish, from English "pint" but in volume only 1/2 pint) or "choppe" (in French) in Belgium, was the basis of the "fluitjesbier" distributed during the German occupation in WWII and under rationing. This "fluitjesbier" was watered down to about 0.8° (compared to fruitjuice which can have up to 1.5° due to natural fermentation).

Bock

Bock is a strong lager of German origin. Some Belgian brewers have produced bock-style beers what makes it a style applicable to Belgium.

White or wheat beer

This type of beer, commonly called witbier in Dutch, bière blanche in French and wheat beer in English, originated in the Flemish part of Belgium in the Middle Ages. Traditionally, it is made with a mixture of wheat and barley. Before hops became widely available in Europe, beers were flavoured with a mixture of herbs called gruit. In the later years of the Middle Ages, hops were added to the gruit. That mixture continues today in most Belgian white beers.

The production of this type of beer in Belgium had nearly ended by the late 1950s. In the town of Hoegaarden, the last witbier brewery, Tomsin, closed its doors in 1955. However, ten years later, a young farmer by the name of Pierre Celis in the same village decided to try reviving the beer. In 1966, Celis began brewing a wit beer in his farm house. Ultimately, his beer took the name of the village and became very successful and famous.

Some notable current examples are Celis White, Blanche de Namur and Watou's Wit. Their alcohol strength is about 5–6 percent ABV, and these beers can be quite refreshing, especially during the warm summer months. The herb mixture traditionally includes coriander and bitter orange peel, among other herbs. White beers also have a moderate light grain sweetness from the wheat used. In recent times, brewers have been making fruit flavoured wheat beers.

Blonde or golden ale

These are a light variation on pale ale, often made with pilsner malt. Some beer writers regard blonde and golden ales as distinct styles, while others do not. Duvel is the archetypal Belgian blonde ale, and one of the most popular bottled beers in the country as well as being well known internationally. Its name means "Devil" and some other blonde beers follow the theme—Satan, Lucifer and Judas for example. The style is popular with Walloon brewers, the slightly hazy Moinette being the best-known example. Chouffe can be considered a spiced version (with coriander).

Hop-accentuated beers and India pale ale
A few Belgian beers are pale and assertively hopped. 's  has a British-style name. 's , another example, hails from Belgium's hop-growing district.

Lambic beers (including gueuze and fruit lambics)

Lambic is a wheat beer brewed in the Pajottenland region of Belgium (southwest of Brussels) by spontaneous fermentation. Most modern beers are fermented by carefully cultivated strains of brewer's yeasts; Lambic's fermentation, however, is produced by exposure to the wild yeasts and bacteria that are said to be native to the Zenne valley, in which Brussels lies. The beer then undergoes a long aging period ranging from three to six months (considered "young") to two or three years for mature. It is this unusual process which gives the beer its distinctive flavour: dry, vinous, and cidery, with a slightly sour aftertaste.

From Lambic four kinds of beer are produced: Lambic, Gueuze, Fruit Lambic, and Faro.

 The first of these, Lambic, is the unblended basic brew (young) or the refermented basic brew (old). Lambic is a draught beer which is rarely bottled, and thus only available in its area of production and a few cafes in and around Brussels. 
 The youngest of the Lambic brews, Faro, which is lambic just after the first fermentation is sometimes served with sugar or caramel added to make it palatable for consumption.
 Gueuze blends old and young brews to stimulate a final fermentation, sometimes from three consecutive years (cfr sherry-method). Gueuze is the finished product, the beer that is commercialised. Top quality Geuze is bottled in large bottles (75cl) with a champagne-like cork, that require delicate handling, and controlled environmental conditions much like wine. 
 Fruit beers are made by adding fruit or fruit concentrate to Lambic or a mixture of Lambic brews before the final refermenting stage. The most common type is Kriek, made with sour cherries.

Amber ales
These are beers similar to the traditional pale ales of England, although less bitterly hopped. A notable example is the 5% ABV De Koninck brand, with its distinctive half-spherical glasses (called 'bollekes'). It is popular in its native city of Antwerp. Another is Palm Speciale. A very strong ambrée is brewed by "Bush" (Dubuisson), another brewery influenced by British styles.

Tripel

Tripel is a term used originally by brewers in the Low Countries to describe a strong pale ale, and became associated with Westmalle Tripel. The style of Westmalle's Tripel and the name was widely copied by the breweries of Belgium, then the term spread to the US and other countries. Gulden Draak was awarded the best-tasting beer in the world in 1998 by the American Tasting Institute (now ChefsBest).

Dubbel

Dubbel (double) has a characteristic brown colour. It is one of the classic Abbey/Trappist types, having been developed in the 19th century at the Trappist monastery in Westmalle. Today, some commercial brewers using abbey names call their strong brown beers "Dubbel". Typically, a dubbel is between 6 and 8% abv. In addition to the dubbels made by most Trappist breweries, examples include St. Bernardus Pater, Adelardus Dubbel, Maredsous 8 and Witkap Dubbel.

Dubbels are characteristically bottle conditioned.

Flemish Red

Typified by Rodenbach, the eponymous brand that started this type over a century ago, this beer's distinguishing features from a technical viewpoint are a specially roasted malt, fermentation by a mixture of several 'ordinary' top-fermenting yeasts and a lactobacillus culture (the same type of bacteria yoghurt is made with) and maturation in oak. The result is a mildly strong 'drinking' beer with a deep reddish-brown colour and a distinctly acidic, sour yet fruity and mouthy taste. This style is closely related to Oud bruin.

Oud bruin, or Flemish sour brown ale

This style, aged in wooden casks, is a cousin to the sour "Flemish Red" style. Examples include Goudenband and Petrus.

Brown ale

Scotch ales

These sweet, heavy-bodied brown ales represent a style which originated in the British Isles. The Caledonian theme is usually heavily emphasized with tartan and thistles appearing on labels. Examples include Gordon's, Scotch de Silly and La Chouffe Mc Chouffe.

Stout
Belgian stouts subdivide into sweeter and drier, and stronger and weaker versions.
Examples include Callewaerts and Ellezelloise Hercule. The sweeter versions resemble the almost-defunct British style "milk stout", while the stronger ones are sometimes described as Imperial stouts.

Champagne beers
Champagne style beers are generally ales that are finished "à la méthode originale" for champagne. They receive a second fermentation much like Champagne does and are stored for several months "sûr lie" while the fermentation lasts. This creates the smaller, softer bubbles that we know from Champagne, but maintains the beer flavour and style.

Quadrupel or Grand Cru

In Belgium "Grand Cru" is more often used than "Quadrupel", these beers are a mostly a blend of brews, which is often refermented as a blend.

Saison

Saison (French for "season") is the name originally given to refreshing, low-alcohol beers brewed seasonally in Wallonia, the French-speaking region of Belgium. First seen in early 19th century Liège, saisons gained notoriety as a luxury beer in 20th century Hainaut brewed by city and countryside brewers alike. By the 1980s, they were only produced on the countryside. Modern-day saisons are also brewed in other countries, particularly USA, and are generally bottle conditioned, with an average range of 5 to 8% ABV, though saisons at the more traditional 3.5% strength can still be found.

Although saison has been described as an endangered style, there has been a rise in interest in this style in recent years, with Saison Dupont being named "the Best Beer in the World" by the magazine Men's Journal in July 2005.

A related style known as a grisette was brewed with a lower ABV and with wheat added.

Winter or Christmas beers
Many breweries produce special beers during December. Most contain more alcohol than the brewery's other types of beer and may also contain spicing. An annual beer festival in Essen near Antwerp focuses on this type of beer with over 190 beers available for tasting in 2014.

Fruit beers (non-Lambic)

Some brewers that are not Lambic-brewers make fruit beers in a similar process as the Fruit Lambic beers.

All brewers of this style make fruit lambic. Many brewers of top fermentation beers such as Belgian golden ales, ambers and Flemish old brown beers, that produce beers that usually go through a multiple stage fermentation process, are catching on to the trend to make fruit beers. The process starts after the first fermentation of the wort, when sometimes sugar is added to referment the beer on wooden casks. To make fruit beer the fruit, juice or syrup is added (instead of sugar) to the first brew and refermented, these may be termed fruit lambics or fruit beers, depending on the type of first brew.

Beer that has fruit syrup or fruit lemonade added after (the final stage of) fermentation, in other words as a flavouring, are termed "Radlers" ("Shandy" in the UK) definitely not fruit beer.

Unused styles
Sometimes the following styles are referred to as a type/style of Belgian Beer, however these are not because they cover multiple styles :

Strong ale
Beers above 7%, such as tripels or strong dubbels, are referred to in some sources as Belgian strong ale, although this is not a name used by Belgian brewers.

Table beer
Table beer (tafelbier, bière de table) is a low-alcohol (typically not over 1.5%) brew sold in large bottles to be enjoyed with meals. The last decade it has gradually lost popularity due to the growing consumption of soft drinks and bottled water. It comes in blonde or brown versions. Table beer used to be served in school refectories until the 1980s; in the early 21st century, several organizations made proposals to reinstate this custom as the table beer is considered more healthy than soft drinks. Some bars serve a glass of draft lager with a small amount of table beer added, to take away the fizziness and act as a sweetener, in Limburg it is referred to as a "half om".

Archaic styles
These include
 Arge: A sour beer from Antwerp
 Faro: A beer that was drunk sweetened. Not necessarily the same as the modern Faro.
 Grisette ("little gray"): A lower-alcohol Saison drunk originally by miners in Hainaut.
 Happe: A predecessor of wheat beer, made with wheat and oats.
 Hoppe: An early hopped beer, from the mid-1500s when gruit was widely used.
 Kuyte: also called Cuyte, a strong beer originating in 16th century France, as Quente, before becoming established in Belgium. Popular with the upper classes.
 Pecce: A cheap beer.
 Roedbier: Literally, red beer. It is not clear if this was a single style.
 Uitzet: A sour beer.
 Walgbaert or Waegebaert: Similar to Happe.
 Zwaartbier: Literally, black beer. It is not clear whether this was a single style.

Glassware
Belgian "special" beers (stronger or bottled beers) are often served in elaborate branded beer glassware. Unless the bar is out of the specific glass that goes with that beer it is more often than not served in its own glass. Most bartenders or waitresses will apologize if the beer comes in a different glass.

One of the more common types is the tulip glass.
A tulip glass not only helps trap the aroma, but also aids in maintaining large heads, creating a visual and olfactory sensation. The body is bulbous, but the top flares out to form a lip which helps head retention.

A vessel similar to a champagne flute is the preferred serving vessel for Belgian lambics and fruit beers. The narrow shape helps maintain carbonation, while providing a strong aromatic front. Flute glasses display the lively carbonation, sparkling colour, and soft lacing of this distinct style.

Chalices and goblets are large, stemmed, bowl-shaped glasses mainly associated with Trappist and Abbey ales. The distinction between goblet and chalice is typically in the glass thickness. Goblets tend to be more delicate and thin, while the chalice is heavy and thick walled. Some chalices are even etched on the bottom to nucleate a stream of bubbles for maintaining a nice head.

In addition to the profusion of glasses provided by brewers, some Belgian beer cafés serve beer in their own "house" glassware. An example is La Lunette in Brussels.

Distribution

The majority of Belgian beer brands are sold in bottles. Draught beers tend mostly to be pale lagers, wheat beers, regional favourites such as kriek in Brussels or De Koninck in Antwerp; and the occasional one-off. Customers who purchase a bottled beer (often called a "special" beer) can expect the beers to be served ceremoniously, often with a free snack.

These days, Belgian beers are sold in brown- (or sometimes dark green-) tinted glass bottles (to avoid negative effects of light on the beverage) and sealed with a cork, a metal crown cap, or sometimes both. Some beers are bottle conditioned, meaning reseeded with yeast so that an additional fermentation may take place. Different bottle sizes exist: 25 cl, 33 cl, 37.5 cl, 75 cl and multiples of 75. (8, 12, 24 or multiples of 24 fl. oz.) The 37.5 cl size is usually for lambics. Other beers are generally bottled in 25 or 33 cl format (depending on brands). The bigger bottles (75 cl) are sold almost in every food shop but customers do not always have an extensive choice. Bottles larger than 75 cl are named following the terminology used for champagne and are limited in quantity. In Belgian cafés, when someone orders a demi (English: "half"), he receives a 50 cl (half liter) glass (with beer from the tap, or from 2 bottles of 25 cl).

Virtually every Belgian beer has a branded glass imprinted with a logo or name.

Belgium contains thousands of cafés that offer a wide selection of beers, ranging from perhaps 10 (including bottles) in a neighborhood café, to over 1000 in a specialist beer café. Among the most famous are "Beer Circus," "Chez Moeder Lambic," and "Delirium Café" in Brussels; "Billie's Bier Kafétaria", "de Kulminator" and "Oud Arsenaal" in Antwerp, "Barnabeer" in Namur, "De Garre" and "'t Brugs Beertje" in Bruges, "Het Botteltje" in Ostend, "Het Hemelrijk" in Hasselt, "Het Waterhuis aan de Bierkant", "De Dulle Griet" and "Trappistenhuis" in Ghent, "De Blauwe Kater" in Leuven, the Vaudrées in Liège and the "Stillen Genieter" in Mechelen. Although many major brands of beer are available at most supermarkets, off-licences located throughout the country generally offer a far wider selection, albeit at somewhat higher prices.

International distribution

Belgium exports almost 80% of its beer. Some draught-beer brands produced by AB InBev – Stella Artois, Hoegaarden and Leffe – are available in several European countries. Aside from these, mostly bottled beer is exported across Europe. Cafés, exclusively or primarily offering Belgian beers, exist beyond Belgium in Australia, New Zealand, Canada, France, the United Kingdom and the United States, amongst others. Some beer festivals outside Belgium have a Belgian beer bar as an alternative to local products. In North America, a growing number of draught Belgian beer brands have started to become available, often at "Belgian Bars". Such brands include Brasserie Brunehaut, Karmeliet, Kwak, Maredsous, Mont Saint-Aubert, Palm, Rodenbach and St. Feuillien.

Beer festivals
Belgium has a number of beer festivals including:
 The BAB-bierfestival, held every year in February in Bruges
 Zythos Beer Festival or ZBF. The festival held every spring in Leuven (previously in Sint Niklaas and Antwerp) organized by the consumer group Zythos.
 The Belgian Beer Weekend held in Grand-Place, Brussels, organized by the Brewer's association.
 Karakterbieren Festival in Poperinge, Belgium's hop-growing capital.
 The Beer Passion weekend held each July in Antwerp, organized by Beer passion magazine,
 The Modeste Bier Festival held the 1st Weekend of Oct in Antwerp, Run by Antwerps Bier College.
 The Christmas beer festival Essen
 Alvinne Craft Beer Festival, at Picobrouwerij Alvinne, Zwevegem (Moen)
 The Weekend of Belgian Beers, held in Hasselt in November, organized by the Limburgse Biervrienden
 The Weekend of Special Beer in Sohier in February – all informations : http://Www.sohier-village.be
 Since 2017 Billie's Bier Kafétaria and Hop is Hop organises Billie's Craft Beer Fest.  A unique formula for Belgium (all in formula) with 50 of the very best (Inter)national craft breweries. Annually half of November

Beer cuisine 
A number of traditional Belgian dishes use beer as an ingredient. One is carbonade (French) or stoverij or stoofvlees (Dutch), a stew of beef cooked in beer, similar to Boeuf bourguignon. The beer used is typically the regional speciality—lambic in Brussels, De Koninck in Antwerp, and so on—so that the taste of the dish varies. Another is rabbit in gueuze. In't Spinnekopke, Brussels, and Den Dyver, Bruges are famed for their beer cookery. In 1998 Anheuser-Busch InBev started a worldwide chain of bars/restaurants, Belgian Beer Cafe, serving typical Belgian dishes combined with Belgian Beer.

The varied nature of Belgian beers makes it possible to match them against each course of a meal, for instance:
 Wheat beer with seafood or fish.
 Blond beers or tripel with chicken or white meat
 Dubbel or other dark beers with dark meat
 Fruit lambics with dessert

Appreciation and organizations
"Beer Passion" is a magazine, which also organizes a beer festival.
"Zythos" is the name of the main consumer's organization, successor to the earlier OBP (Objectieve Bierproevers).
The Belgian Brewers' Association represents breweries. It organizes beer festivals and an open breweries day.
The Knighthood of the Mashstaff honours individuals who have made an outstanding contribution to brewing, and pays tribute to Gambrinus and Saint Arnold.

Beer writers who have written extensively on Belgian beer include Belgians Peter Crombeq, Gert van Lierde and Erik Verdonck, and Britons Michael Jackson and Tim Webb.

On 1 December 2016, in the eleventh session of the Intergovernmental Committee for the Safeguarding of the Intangible Cultural Heritage held in the United Nations Economic Commission for Africa Conference Centre, Addis Ababa, as an appreciation towards the beer culture in Belgium, it was inscribed on the Representative List of the Intangible Cultural Heritage of Humanity.

Belgian beer brands

The following list contains beers that are brewed in Belgium. Not to be confused with "Belgian style" beers that are produced in other countries, and may or may not resemble a style that is specific to Belgium.

See also

 Beer and breweries by region
High Council for Artisanal Lambic Beers
Méthode Champenoise

References 

Bibliography
Good Beer Guide to Belgium, Tim Webb, CAMRA Books, 
Farmhouse Ales: Culture and Craftsmanship in the Belgian Tradition, Phil Marowski, Brewers Publications (2004), 
Great Beers of Belgium, Michael Jackson, 
Lambicland: Lambikland, Tim Webb, Chris Pollard, Joris Pattyn, Cogan and Mater Ltd, 
Alle Belgische Bieren, Ed. Hilde Deweer, Stichting Kunstboek Oostkamp, 2015

External links

All About Belgian Beer in English Language
Belgium's Great Beers
Belgian Beer Map – Distribution of Belgian breweries by provinces 
All About Belgian Beer and Beer Tourism in Belgium   from BeerTourism.com